Shamsul may refer to:
Shamsul Iskandar Md. Akin, Malaysian politician, Member of Parliament for Bukit Katil
Shamsul-hasan Shams Barelvi (born 1917), Pakistani Islamic scholar and translator of classical Islamic texts
Shamsul Huda Chaudhury (1920–2000), Bangladeshi politician, twice Speaker of Bangladesh Jatiya Sangsad
Shamsul Haque Faridpuri (1896–1969), Bangladeshi Islamic scholar, educationist, and social reformer
Syed Shamsul Haque (born 1935), Bangladeshi poet and writer
Syed Shamsul Hasan (1885–1981), leader of the Pakistan Muslim League and before independence of All India Muslim League
Wajid Shamsul Hasan, Pakistani diplomat
Kazi Shamsul Hoque (born 1945), Bangladeshi journalist, founding editor of Akhon Samoy
Muhammad Shamsul Huq (1912–2006), Bangladeshi academic and former Minister of Foreign Affairs
Shamsul Huq, Bengali politician, advocate for the recognition of the Bengali language during the 1950s
Md Shamsul Hasan Khan (born 1926), Member of the Parliament of India
Shamsul Maidin (born 1966), Singaporean association football referee
Shamsul Kamal Mohamad (born 1989), Malaysian professional footballer
Shamsul Mulk, Pakistani civil engineer and a Technocrat
Shamsul Anuar Nasarah, Malaysian politician, Member of the Parliament for the Lenggong constituency in Perak
Shamsul Huda Shams, a Great Afghan Nationalist (died 2005), president of the Afghan Social Democratic Party

Multiple people with the same given name
 Shamsul Islam (disambiguation)

See also
Shamsul Ulama Islamic Academy in Kerala, India
Shamsul Huda Stadium in Jessore, Bangladesh